D86  may refer to:
 D86 (debugger), a debugger associated with the A86 software
 HMS Agincourt (D86), a Royal Navy Battle class destroyer
 HMS Birmingham (D86), a Royal Navy Type 42 destroyer
 HMS Hawkins (D86), a Royal Navy Hawkins class cruisers
 Sequoia Field airport FAA location identifier
Grünfeld Defence, Encyclopaedia of Chess Openings code
 A method for automated distillation by ASTM